Torneo Federal B was one of two leagues that form the fourth level of the Argentine football league system, made up of 100+ teams playing within eight regional zones across Argentina.

The other league at level four wasand still isthe Primera C Metropolitana, which is a competition for the numerous clubs in the city of Buenos Aires and the Greater Buenos Aires metropolitan area.

The Torneo Federal B was replaced with the similar Torneo Regional Federal Amateur for the 2019 season), while the Primera C continued on as its tier four companion for the Buenos Aires area.

List of champions

See also
Argentine football league system
List of football clubs in Argentina

References

External links
Torneo Argentino B at AFA website

Defunct football leagues in Argentina
Fourth level football leagues of South America